Nelson Holmes Van Vorhes (January 23, 1822 – December 4, 1882) was an American newspaperman and politician who served two terms as a U.S. Representative from Ohio from 1875 to 1879.

Biography
Born in Washington County, Pennsylvania, Van Vorhes moved to Athens County, Ohio, in 1832 and engaged in agricultural pursuits.
Apprenticed to a printer for six years.
He was editor and proprietor of The Athens Messenger 1844-1861.
He served as member of the State House of Representatives 1850-1872 and served four years as speaker.

Van Vorhes lost the election for Ohio Secretary of State as a Whig in 1853.
Van Vorhes was elected probate judge in 1854, but resigned.
He was an unsuccessful candidate for election in 1858 to the Thirty-sixth Congress.
He served as delegate to the Republican National Convention in 1860.
He entered the Union Army as a private in 1861 and was mustered out as colonel of the 92nd Ohio Infantry in the Summer of 1863, when his health failed. His father was: Abraham Van Vorhes who also served in the Ohio General Assembly and Minnesota Territorial Legislature and his brother was: Andrew J. Van Vorhes who served in the Minnesota House of Representatives.

Van Vorhes was elected as a Republican to the Forty-fourth and Forty-fifth Congresses (March 4, 1875 – March 3, 1879).
He was an unsuccessful candidate for reelection in 1878 to the Forty-sixth Congress.
He died in Athens, Ohio, December 4, 1882, and was interred in West Union Street Cemetery.

References

 Retrieved on 2008-10-18

1822 births
1882 deaths
Speakers of the Ohio House of Representatives
Ohio state court judges
19th-century American newspaper editors
Union Army colonels
People from Washington County, Pennsylvania
People from Athens, Ohio
Ohio Whigs
People of Ohio in the American Civil War
American male journalists
19th-century American male writers
19th-century American politicians
Journalists from Ohio
Journalists from Pennsylvania
19th-century American judges
Republican Party members of the United States House of Representatives from Ohio
Military personnel from Pennsylvania